Suffrage Atelier was an artists' collective campaigning for women's suffrage in England. It was founded in February 1909 by Laurence Housman, Clemence Housman and Alfred Pearse. Clemence was a writer, illustrator, and wood engraver, and her brother Laurence was a fantasy writer.

The Atelier, which became a major political entity, accepted as its members women who were professional illustrators and writers but also encouraged non-professional artists to submit work, and paid them a small percentage of any profits. It held its first public meeting in London in February 1909, styling itself as an "Arts and Crafts Society working for the enfranchisement of women".

The collective is supposed to have been formed as a result of collaboration between members of the Kensington Branch of the Women's Social and Political Union who worked together to produce a banner entitled From Prison to Citizenship, which was designed by the Housmans.

It ran printmaking, banner-making, drawing and stenciling workshops and held competitions. The Suffrage Atelier's policy   

was to produce only what could be quickly reproduced and circulated and so made great use of block-printing, both in wood and as linocuts in response to events. Clemence Housman was a well-respected member of the WSPU, so much of the production of the Suffrage Atelier was distributed in the WSPU store chains and national newspaper.

One of the first requests for the work of the organisation was for stock for the art stall at the WSPU's 1909 Princes' Skating Rink Exhibition. In the main, the Atelier worked with the Women's Freedom League and in December 1909 it produced a banner entitled Let Glasgow Flourish for the Glasgow Central WFL, and another banner for the Glasgow West branch.

It also designed and produced a banner for the Tax Resistance League, which was carried in a procession on 18 June 1910. In the Women's Coronation procession in June 1911, the group carried their own banner which showed Athena with her symbols of the owl, olive, cock, serpent, sphynx the Victory and Medusa head.

The Suffrage Atelier had a large body of subscribers that included both men and non-professionals. Subscribers were encouraged to submit fine art, poster and post card designs, craft work, and donations. Subscribers also helped organize pageants and exhibitions.

Members 

 Catherine Courtauld
 Edith Craig
 Isobel Pocock
 Gladys Letcher
 A.E. Hope Joseph
Katharine Gatty (Secretary from 1912)
Miss E.B. Willis (Honorary Secretary 1909–14).

See also
List of suffragists and suffragettes
List of women's rights activists
Timeline of women's suffrage
Women's suffrage in the United Kingdom
Women's suffrage publications

References

British artist groups and collectives
Political art
Women's suffrage in the United Kingdom